Pele Cowley (born 16 April 1993) is a Samoan international rugby union player who currently plays as a halfback for  in New Zealand's domestic Mitre 10 Cup. He also plays for the Austin Gilgronis of Major League Rugby (MLR) in the United States.

Senior career

Cowley originally came up through the club ranks in Auckland before earning his first provincial recognition with the Pukekohe-based, Counties Manukau Steelers in 2015.   He switched provinces in 2016, playing club rugby with Hamilton Old Boys as well as making 5 appearances for Waikato in the 2016 Mitre 10 Cup.

International

Cowley was still an Auckland club player when he received his first senior call up from Samoa in 2014.   He debuted as a second-half substitute in a 24–13 defeat against  in Ascoli Piceno on 8 November 2014.

References

1993 births
Living people
Samoan rugby union players
Samoa international rugby union players
Rugby union scrum-halves
Waikato rugby union players
Counties Manukau rugby union players
Rugby union players from Auckland
Cardiff Rugby players
Austin Gilgronis players